Zelyonaya Polyana is a rural locality (a settlement) in Fruzensky Selsoviet, Aleysky District, Altai Krai, Russia. The population was 3 as of 2013. There are 4 streets.

Geography 
Zelyonaya Polyana is located 10 km south of Aleysk (the district's administrative centre) by road. Malakhovo is the nearest rural locality.

References 

Rural localities in Aleysky District